The Presenzano Hydroelectric Plant, officially known as the Domenico Cimarosa Hydroelectric Plant, is located along the Volturno River in Presenzano, Province of Caserta, Italy. Construction began in 1979, it was finished in 1990 and the generators commissioned in 1991. In 2004, the plant was renamed after Domenico Cimarosa. Power is generated by releasing water from the upper Cesima reservoir down to the power plant which contains four reversible 250 MW Francis pump-turbine-generators. After power production, the water is sent to the lower reservoir. During periods of low energy demand, the same pump-generators pump water from the lower reservoir back to the upper where it becomes stored energy. Power generation occurs when energy demand is high.

See also

Hydroelectricity in Italy
List of pumped-storage hydroelectric power stations

References

Dams completed in 1990
Energy infrastructure completed in 1991
Pumped-storage hydroelectric power stations in Italy
Dams in Italy
1991 establishments in Italy
Buildings and structures in the Province of Caserta